Harald Siegl (born 17 April 1972) is an Austrian equestrian. He competed in two events at the 2004 Summer Olympics.

His daughter, Lea Siegl, competed in Individual Eventing at the 2020 Summer Olympics.

References

1972 births
Living people
Austrian male equestrians
Olympic equestrians of Austria
Equestrians at the 2004 Summer Olympics
Sportspeople from Linz